Wiebke Eden (born 19 January 1968 in Jever, Lower Saxony), is a German writer.

In 1988 Eden started to work as a trainee at the Jeversches Wochenblatt. Afterwards she became an editor. From 1991 to 1996 she studied German Studies and Pedagogy at the University of Oldenburg before a full-time career as a freelance journalist and writer. In 2008, she published her first novel, Zeit der roten Früchte (Time of the red fruits) .

References

External links 
 http://www.narrentanz.de/index.html  – Official Web site

1968 births
Living people
People from Jever
German women writers